The men's normal hill individual ski jumping competition for the 1980 Winter Olympics was held at Lake Placid Olympic Ski Jumping Complex. It occurred on 17 February.

Results

References

Ski jumping at the 1980 Winter Olympics